Konstantin Sergeyevich Semenov (born 9 June 1989, Tokmok) is a Russian beach volleyball player. He competed for Russia at the 2012 Summer Olympics with his teammate Sergey Prokopyev finishing at the shared 9th place. As of August 2013 he has won one tournament in the FIVB World Tour and two in the CEV European Tour alongside two other podium spots in the World Tour. At the 2016 Summer Olympics, Semenov and his new teammate Vyacheslav Krasilnikov finished as fourth.  Since the end of 2017, Semenov plays with Ilya Leshukov. They qualified for 2020 Summer Olympics in Tokyo.

References

External links
 

1989 births
Living people
Russian beach volleyball players
Men's beach volleyball players
Beach volleyball players at the 2012 Summer Olympics
Beach volleyball players at the 2016 Summer Olympics
Olympic beach volleyball players of Russia
Universiade medalists in beach volleyball
Universiade bronze medalists for Russia
Medalists at the 2013 Summer Universiade
Beach volleyball players at the 2020 Summer Olympics
20th-century Russian people
21st-century Russian people